"My First Night Without You" is the second single released from Cyndi Lauper's third album A Night To Remember (1989).

Song information
The ballad is about coming home for the first time without a partner being there after a break up. The video clip is also about this, with Lauper coming home after a long day at work to an empty room after a separation. The song was written by Lauper, Tom Kelly and Billy Steinberg. The latter two also wrote "True Colors" and "I Drove All Night".

Its B-side was "Unabbreviated Love". The song is a fan favorite; Lauper performed it many times on her A Night to Remember tour in 1989.

To promote the single, promotional posters were sent to different malls and music stores that sold the single when it was originally released.

The single failed to make a big impact on most charts in the world. It did do moderately well in Chile. In the Radio Cidade from São Paulo, Brazil, this song was #1. In Colombia, the single was #1 for 10 weeks.

Music video
The video for "My First Night Without You", released in 1989, was one of the first to be closed-captioned for the hearing impaired.

Chart performance

Track listing

7" / Cassette / Europe 3" CD single / Japan 3" CD single
 "My First Night Without You" (edited remix) – 2:58
 "Unabbreviated Love" – 4:18

UK Limited Edition 7" (with poster)
 "My First Night Without You" (edited remix) – 2:58
 "True Colors" – 3:47

12" / Europe 5" CD maxi-single
 "My First Night Without You" (edited remix) – 2:58
 "Unabbreviated Love" – 4:18
 "True Colors" – 3:46

UK 12" / UK 5" CD single
 "My First Night Without You" (edited remix) – 2:58
 "Unabbreviated Love" – 4:18
 "True Colors" – 3:47
 "All Through the Night" – 4:32

UK Limited Edition Picture Disc CD single
 "My First Night Without You" (edited remix) – 2:58
 "Unabbreviated Love" – 4:18
 "Iko Iko" – 2:05
 "When You Were Mine" – 5:01

References

1989 songs
Songs written by Tom Kelly (musician)
Songs written by Billy Steinberg
Cyndi Lauper songs
Songs written by Cyndi Lauper
Epic Records singles
1980s ballads
Pop ballads